Thiem is a surname with origins from Germany and Holland. People with the name include:

 Dominic Thiem (born 1993), Austrian professional tennis player
 George Thiem (1897–1987), American journalist
 Kathrin Thiem (born 1988), German rower

See also
 Lê Văn Thiêm (1918–1991), Vietnamese scientist and mathematician
 Thiem solution, aquifer analysis method

Surnames of German origin
Surnames of Dutch origin
Surnames from given names